The Texas Desert Shield-Desert Storm Campaign Medal is the third highest campaign/service award that may be issued to a service member of the Texas Military Forces.

Eligibility
The Texas Desert Shield-Desert Storm Campaign Medal shall be issued to any service member of the Texas Military Forces who: 

 Was mobilized into service under command of the United States Armed Forces (Title 10)
 After 1 Aug 1990 in support of Operation Desert Shield and/or Operation Desert Storm
 Without regard to location the service member was deployed

Authority

Awarding 
Texas Government Code, Chapter 437 (Texas Military), Subchapter H. (Awards), Section 355 (Other Awards), Line 12.

Legal 
The Texas Desert Shield-Desert Storm Campaign Medal was established by Senator John N. Leedom in Senate Bill 573, authorized by the Seventy-second Texas Legislature, and approved by Governor Ann Richards on 5 June 1991, effective on 26 August 1991.

Description 
The medal pendant is of bronze, 1-1/4 of an inch in diameter. On the obverse side of the pendant is the State of Texas and superimposed over the State of Texas is a C-130 Hercules transport airplane over the panhandle of the state and in the center of the State of Texas are two Soldiers, waiting in readiness, encircled by the words "OPERATION DESERT STORM/DESERT SHIELD CAMPAIGN MEDAL". On the reverse side of the pendant is a five-pointed raised star, one point up, 1/2 of an inch in diameter, surrounded by a wreath formed by an olive branch on the right and a live oak branch on the left, encircled by the words, "TEXAS NATIONAL GUARD", along the upper arc and "FOR SERVICE", along the lower arc, in raised letters. The pendant is suspended by a ring from a silk moiré ribbon, 1-3/8 inches long and 1-3/8 inches wide, composed of stripes of blue (1/16 of an inch), white (1/16 of an inch), red (1/16 of an inch), tan (3/8 of an inch), black (1/8 of an inch), tan (3/8 of an inch), red (1/16 of an inch), white (1/16 of an inch), and blue (1/16 of an inch).

Notable recipients

See also 

 Awards and decorations of the Texas Military
 Awards and decorations of the Texas government

 Texas Military Forces
 Texas Military Department
 List of conflicts involving the Texas Military

References

Texas

Texas Military Forces
Texas Military Department